Todd Boehly (born September 20, 1973) is an American businessman and investor. He is the co-founder, chairman, chief executive officer and controlling member of Eldridge Industries, a holding company headquartered in Greenwich, Connecticut. He is also the interim CEO of the Hollywood Foreign Press Association and co-owner and chairman of  football club Chelsea.

Early life and education 
Boehly, whose grandparents emigrated from Germany, attended Landon School in Bethesda, Maryland, graduating in 1991. He was a member of the school's wrestling team, which won I.A.C. championships in both 1990 and 1991. In 2014, Landon named their facilities the Boehly Family Wrestling Room in Boehly's honor.

Boehly graduated from the College of William & Mary in 1996 with a Bachelor of Business Administration in Finance. He also studied at the London School of Economics. While at the London School of Economics, Boehly began working at Citibank and then at CS First Boston.

Career

1996–2015: Early career, Guggenheim Partners 
Boehly spent his early career at Credit Suisse First Boston and J.H. Whitney & Company. He joined Guggenheim Partners in 2001, where he launched the firm's credit investing business, assumed responsibility of its asset management business, and served as president.

In early 2013, Boehly led a deal between Time Warner Cable and the Los Angeles Dodgers of Major League Baseball to create SportsNet LA, a regional network to broadcast all Dodgers’ games and Dodgers-related programming. Broadcasting from the team-owned network began with the 2014 baseball season.

2015–present: Founding Eldridge, investment career 
In 2015, Boehly bought some of the assets he had collected at Guggenheim, including The Hollywood Reporter, Dick Clark Productions, and Security Benefit to found Eldridge, a private holding company which invests in various industries. In addition to Greenwich, Eldridge also has offices in New York, London and Beverly Hills.

Boehly is on the boards of Cain International, Kennedy Wilson, PayActiv, Vivid Seats, Viral Nation, Accelerant, CAIS, Horizon Acquisition I, and Horizon Acquisition Corporation II. He was formerly on the board of Truebill.

Boehly's firm Eldridge owns Security Benefit Life Insurance, and SE2, a technology platform for insurance companies. As CEO, chairman and co-founder of Eldridge, he invested in Clearcover Insurance, and DPL Financial Advisors, an RIA insurance network. His real estate investments include Cain International, a real estate firm co-owned by Eldridge, Kennedy Wilson and Langdon Park Capital. He helped found European real investment firm Blackbrook Capital.

Boehly has invested in the digital technology industry, including companies such as Gopuff, Stash, Wealthsimple, Dataminr, AI security company AnyVision, digital health platform Wellthy, Truebill, and Tripledot Studios. He acquired data technology company Knoema through Eldridge in 2020.

Boehly has invested in the hospitality group Aurify Brands, which owns restaurant chains such as Le Pain Quotidien. He also invested in Chuck E. Cheese.

Boehly's Eldridge owns Stonebriar Commercial Finance, a large ticket commercial finance and leasing company, and seeded Essential Properties Realty Trust. Some of Eldridge's credit management operations were spun out in 2021 to create Panagram Structured Asset Management. Eldridge co-founded CBAM Partners, an SEC-registered investment advisor. It was sold to The Carlyle Group for $787 million in 2022.

Sports 
Boehly owns 20% of the Los Angeles Dodgers and is also a part owner of the Los Angeles Sparks. He is an owner of fantasy sports company DraftKings and esports organization Cloud9.

In 2019, Boehly made an attempt to buy the English football club Chelsea for $3 billion, but the owner at the time, Russian billionaire tycoon, Roman Abramovich, rejected the takeover bid. In March 2022, alongside Mark Walter, Hansjörg Wyss and Clearlake Capital, he launched a bid to buy the club from Abramovich, who had announced an intention to sell it amid the Russian invasion of Ukraine. On May 6, 2022, Chelsea confirmed that the bid had been accepted and would be finalized by the end of the month. The bid was approved by the UK and Portuguese governments, Premier League, and the European Union, because of Abramovich’s Portuguese citizenship. On May 30, the takeover of the club was completed. Boehly was named chairman and interim sporting director of Chelsea on June 20, 2022, after Bruce Buck stepped down. On January 9, 2023, Boehly stepped down as the interim sporting director of Chelsea.

Boehly and Walter acquired a 27% stake in the Los Angeles Lakers from Philip Anschutz in July 2021. As of February 2021, the Lakers were third-highest valued team in the NBA, with an estimated value of $5.14 billion.

In October 2021, Boehly spoke at SporticoLive's "Invest in Sports" summit to discuss the sports industry and investment in professional sports.

On December 14, 2021, it was announced that Boehly was heading an ownership group in exclusive negotiations to purchase a controlling interest in the Washington Spirit. On January 12, 2022, it was reported that Boehly had withdrawn from negotiations to purchase the team.

Media and entertainment 
Boehly is Chairman of MRC. MRC has invested in A24 and Fulwell 73. In September 2020, it was announced that Boehly's MRC and Penske Media Corporation were merging as part of a joint venture to manage their publications, including Billboard, Rolling Stone, The Hollywood Reporter, Variety and Music Business Worldwide. MRC and Penske announced plans to manage content such as television series, films, and live events through a second joint venture. In 2021, the venture became the majority owner of South by Southwest.

Eldridge and MRC reached an agreement to split their assets as separate entities in 2022. As part of the agreement, Eldridge became a minority stakeholder in MRC, maintaining ownership of Dick Clark Productions from the company, and retained Boehly's investments in ventures such as A24, Fulwell 73, and Penske Media, including the Billboard-Hollywood Reporter Media Group, Luminate Data and South by Southwest.

Boehly led a $3 million investment round for fan engagement platform Laylo.

In October 2021, he was named the interim CEO of the Hollywood Foreign Press Association. In 2022, Eldridge acquired the HFPA, and announced plans to create a for-profit entity to manage the Golden Globe Awards' intellectual property, as well as a nonprofit entity to manage the HFPA's philanthropic efforts.

In April 2022, Boehly led a $250 million investment round in Canadian influencer marketing and technology company, Viral Nation.

Reception 
Boehly was listed on Los Angeles Business Journals list of the 500 most influential people from 2017 to 2021. In 2022, he was included on the Forbes 400 list.

Philanthropy 
Boehly helped found the Boehly Center for Excellence in Finance in 2014 at William & Mary's Raymond A. Mason School of Business with his wife Katie Boehly via a multi-year gift. They also sponsor the yearly women's Stock Pitch and Leadership Summit at William & Mary. In 2020, Boehly and Katie committed funding to the construction of a new athletic complex and sports performance center at the college. They were honorary co-chairs of a $55 million campaign to fund William & Mary Athletics in 2021.

In January 2021, Boehly partnered with William & Mary to produce a series of courses for students at the Boehly Center for Excellence in Finance.

He is also actively involved with various organizations, including Finding a Cure for Epilepsy and Seizures (FACES), the Brunswick School, the Prostate Cancer Foundation, and Focused Ultrasound Foundation.

References 

1973 births
Living people
Alumni of the London School of Economics
American chief executives of financial services companies
Chelsea F.C. chairmen and investors
College of William & Mary alumni
Los Angeles Dodgers owners